Sněžné (until 1948 Německé) is a market town in Žďár nad Sázavou District in the Vysočina Region of the Czech Republic. It has about 700 inhabitants.

Administrative parts
Villages and hamlets of Blatiny, Krátká, Milovy, Podlesí, Samotín and Vříšť are administrative parts of Sněžné.

References

Populated places in Žďár nad Sázavou District
Market towns in the Czech Republic